Alvin Moore may refer to:

 Alvin Moore (equestrian) (1891–1972), American horse rider
 Alvin Moore (American football) (born 1959), American football running back 
 Alvin Head Moore (1838–1911), Canadian politician